Young Lives vs Cancer, the operating name for "CLIC Sargent", is a charity in the United Kingdom formed in 2005. Young Lives vs Cancer is the UK's leading cancer charity for children, young people and their families. Its care teams provide specialist support across the UK.

Young Lives vs Cancer supports people from diagnosis onwards and aims to help the whole family deal with the impact of cancer and its treatment, life after treatment and, in some cases, bereavement.

The charity also undertakes research into the impact of cancer on children and young people. It uses this evidence to raise awareness and to seek to influence government and policy-makers, and those who provide public services across the UK.

History
CLIC Sargent was formed in 2005 after a successful merger between Cancer and Leukaemia in Childhood (CLIC) and Sargent Cancer Care for Children. Sargent was set up in 1967 in memory of conductor Sir Malcolm Sargent who died of cancer.

The charity began operating under a new name - "Young Lives vs Cancer" - in May 2021, the tagline already in use by the charity.

Chief executive 

Young Lives vs Cancer's chief executive is Rachel Kirby-Rider, who took over from Kate Lee in March 2020. Rachel Kirby-Rider had previously worked for the organisation as the Income and Engagement Lead for 5 years before coming appointed.

Awareness and fundraising 

Young Lives vs Cancer's main fundraising and awareness event is Childhood Cancer Awareness Month in September. People also fundraise through runs, cycles and other events.

Ambassadors

 James Allen
 Alice Beer
 Angellica Bell 
 Nicola Benedetti
 Mark Chapman 
 Chris Hollins
 Emma Johnson
 Julian Lloyd Webber  
 Patsy Palmer
 Gaby Roslin 
 Kai Owen
 Michelle Ryan 
 Richard Young
 Susan Young
 Duncan Pow
 Jake Humphrey
 Ben Cajee

Corporate partners 
Corporate partners currently working with Young Lives vs Cancer:

 Credo Asset Finance
 Crerar Hotels 
 Dell 
 Johnson Matthey
 London Steakhouse co.
 Lidl (Northern Ireland)
 Metcalfe's Food Company
 MFS Investment Management
 Manchester Airports Group
 Partylite UK
 Sequence
 Signet Jewelers
 Scentsy 
 BAM Construct UK
 TC facilities management
 Wallis (retailer)
 Wetherspoons 
 Winplus Europe
 Zurich Community Trust

Previous corporate partners include, ITV's Text Santa, Morrisons, Tesco, Chelsea F.C., HMV and Virgin Trains West Coast.

Colas Rail and Virgin Trains West Coast named 60087 and 390047 respectively as CLIC Sargent in support of the charity.

Gallery

See also
 Blood Cancer UK
 Children With Leukaemia
 Leonora Children's Cancer Fund
 Liam Fairhurst
 Neuroblastoma Children's Cancer Alliance UK
 Neuroblastoma Society
Joyce Lishman - social care leader

General:
 Cancer in the United Kingdom

References

External links 

 Young Lives vs Cancer website

2005 establishments in the United Kingdom
Cancer organisations based in the United Kingdom
Children's charities based in the United Kingdom
Health charities in the United Kingdom
Health in the London Borough of Hammersmith and Fulham
Organisations based in the London Borough of Hammersmith and Fulham
Organizations established in 2005
Youth charities based in the United Kingdom